Troy Becker (born Paul Josef Gutowski; 1995), previously known by the pseudonym Paul Zimmer, is an actor and internet personality. Under the Zimmer name, he was a Musical.ly (later TikTok) personality who was known for posting "a fairly innocuous if very corny brand on the app, doing things like making 'thirst trap' videos of himself lip-syncing to R&B songs and flashing his abs with captions like 'Happy Black History Month :)'." However, Zimmer later became a controversial figure after he was accused of financially exploiting his young fans on Musical.ly's sister app, Live.ly, and trying to create a false identity for himself as a minor.

Online image

Live.ly
On the application Live.ly, Zimmer was accused of financial exploitation of his young fans by soliciting paid-for stickers in exchange for online interactions such as shout outs and personalised direct messages; these interactions often did not happen even when people had paid. The practice was commonplace on the app at the time, although ethically dubious as fans included children as young as 13. Zimmer was criticised for failing to deliver on his promises of shoutouts and DMs, leading to the hashtag #BanPaulZimmer trending on the app, and Zimmer leaving Musical.ly. Zimmer later erased the content on his Instagram and YouTube channel (where he had amassed over 1 million followers) and left social media for 18 months.

From Paul Zimmer to Troy Becker
In the first half of 2019, a photograph from The Heller Approach acting school showing "Troy Becker" began to circulate online, as fans recognized Becker to be Zimmer; Zimmer introduced himself as "Paul Becker" in the video days before his legal name change (see below). Later that year, Zimmer – who was then 24 years old – returned to Instagram to announce that he would be handing control of all his social media accounts to an alleged doppelgänger called 'Troy Becker', a 16 (or in some cases 15) year-old whom he described as "a younger, sexier version of me". 

Although Zimmer first tried to claim Becker was Zimmer's younger brother, "Troy Becker" was, in fact, Paul Zimmer. Zimmer did little to alter his appearance and persona for Troy Becker, his main alteration being getting rid of his trademark frosted tips hairstyle. Zimmer fan Hayley Stewart (Haylo Hayley), who had met Zimmer in person, said that he and Paul Becker were the same person. Jennifer, the 20-year-old from Ontario, Canada, who had found Zimmer's acting school video, launched the Instagram account @paulzimmerconspiracies, which gained 510 followers. In addition, Paul Becker's IMDb page (which lists no acting credits) previously had "Paul Zimmer" as an alternative name for the actor "Troy Becker". Zimmer's childhood friend former collaborator Daniel Nodar (Danny Edge on YouTube), who fell out with Zimmer over the scamming controversy, called out "Troy Becker" as a false identity, and said Zimmer had an "inflated ego". Danny, who had criticized Zimmer in the past over scamming tactics and sexualized content directed at minors, agreed: his video explanation on the subject put the story into the mainstream. 

Documents later obtained by Insider showed that Zimmer's name was a pseudonym. Paul Zimmer's legal name was Paul Josef Gutowski, which was successfully changed through the Superior Court of California in March 19, 2019, "months after Zimmer had crafted the identity of Troy Becker through YouTube videos, Facebook pages, and a website". Following this criticism (which focused on the fact that Zimmer was posing as a minor) he later left social media again.

Having changed his legal name to Troy Becker, he announced in March 2020 on TikTok that he was an actor, and said that "Paul Zimmer" was "a character that I created for social media to entertain and inspire people." He elaborated further, saying "I wanted Paul Zimmer to be like, a perfect person, but I found out really quickly that perfection just doesn't exist, so I got super exhausted and depressed trying to be perfect."

Notes

References

1995 births
American TikTokers
Living people